Kaitlyn Louise Verfeurth (born 12 August 1985) is a paracanoe athlete. She is a former American wheelchair tennis player who competed in international level events.

Verfuerth sustained an L2 incomplete spinal cord injury aged seven when she was involved in a car accident in 1993. She spent 96 days hospitalised in Froedtert Hospital in Milwaukee and then two months of bed rest.

Verfuerth competed in wheelchair tennis at the 2004, 2008 and 2016 Paralympic Games. She retired after 2016 Paralympic Games due to the travel demand for tennis players. However, she picked up paracanoe in 2017 after meeting United States' paracanoe coach during the 2016 Games.  She also competed in paracanoe in the 2020 Summer Paralympics in kayak KL2 and va'a VL2.

References

1985 births
Living people
People from Flagstaff, Arizona
People from Port Washington, Wisconsin
People with paraplegia
Tennis people from Wisconsin
Mt. San Antonio College alumni
University of Arizona alumni
Paralympic wheelchair tennis players of the United States
Wheelchair tennis players at the 2004 Summer Paralympics
Wheelchair tennis players at the 2008 Summer Paralympics
Wheelchair tennis players at the 2016 Summer Paralympics
Paracanoeists at the 2020 Summer Paralympics
Paracanoeists of the United States